Champness Glacier is a tributary glacier,  long, draining northeast from the vicinity of Ian Peak in the Bowers Mountains and entering Lillie Glacier at Griffith Ridge, Victoria Land, Antarctica. The glacier was so named by the New Zealand Geological Survey Antarctic Expedition to northern Victoria Land, 1967–68, for G.R. Champness, field assistant with that party. The glacier lies situated on the Pennell Coast, a portion of Antarctica lying between Cape Williams and Cape Adare.

References 

Glaciers of Pennell Coast
1967 in Antarctica
1968 in Antarctica